Cleora repetita is a species of moth of the family Geometridae first described by Arthur Gardiner Butler in 1882. It is found from Sundaland to Australia and the Solomon Islands.

The wingspan is about 40 mm. Adults are greyish brown with a dark wavy line across each wing.

The larvae feed on Terminalia, Premna, Persea (including Persea americana), Callistemon (including Callistemon saligna), Eucalyptus (including Eucalyptus pilularis), Lithomyrtus (including Lithomyrtus obtusa) and Flindersia (including Flindersia australis) species.

References

Moths described in 1882
Cleora
Moths of Oceania